Bob & Doug is a Canadian animated sitcom, which premiered on Global on April 19, 2009. The series is a revival of the SCTV sketch characters Bob and Doug McKenzie.

The first season consisted of 10 episodes. The show was produced by Animax Entertainment. The first season premiered on April 19, 2009, and held the first-season finale on June 29, 2009. A short second season of "five secret episodes" has since aired in sporadic form.

The show was originally planned for development by Fox in the United States. At the time it was known as The Animated Adventures of Bob & Doug McKenzie

Cast

While Dave Thomas, who played Doug in the original CBC sketches, voiced the animated character of Doug, Rick Moranis chose not to provide the voice of Bob, due to his acting hiatus and retirement, although he was one of the series' executive producers alongside Thomas. Bob was instead voiced by Dave Coulier.

In addition to Thomas and Coulier, the program's cast also included Patrick McKenna, Derek McGrath, Neil Crone, Maurice LaMarche, Ron Pardo and Jayne Eastwood.

Synopsis
The series is set in the fictional town of Maple Lake, a town located just across the Canada–United States border from the fictional American metropolis of JFK City, a hotbed of crime and porn. The show centres on Bob and Doug McKenzie, brothers and stereotypical hosers who work as garbage collectors in Maple Lake.

Other characters in the series include:
Peggy (Stacey DePass), a bartender at the Skate 'n Bowl,
Dwight (Michael Dunston), the driver of the McKenzies' garbage truck,
Dennis (Patrick McKenna), an unemployed scam artist constantly pursuing get-rich-quick schemes,
Rupert (Ron Pardo), a dimwitted police officer and the McKenzie brothers' cousin,
Mary Beth (Tracey Hoyt), a television journalist and Rupert's girlfriend,
Henry Chow (Ho Chow), the owner of the local Chinese restaurant,
Melvin (Derek McGrath), the mayor of Maple Lake,
Rev. McRee (Neil Crone), the neighborhood priest.

Episodes

Season 1 (2009)
After several years in limbo, the series finally premiered on April 19, 2009. Early reviews were mixed. Originally slated for 22 episodes, Global instead cut the season short.

Season 2 (2011)
This season is made-up of "five secret episodes" which were aired in Canada, according to the official website. Much is unknown about this season, information regarding scheduling and airdates remain unconfirmed.

Conflicting sources describe the order of the show as 15 episodes rather than 22. A statement from the Animax website has stated that there is some form of movement with airing the show in the US. Several more episodes are reportedly still in development, with a release date still to be determined.

Shorts
From 2002 to 2009, a handful of animated shorts have been released to promote the series. Both Dave Thomas and Rick Moranis have provided their voices in first three shorts.
 The first short was released as a special feature on the Strange Brew DVD as an early awareness trailer.
 During production, another short featured the characters hosting a PowerPoint presentation for Animax Entertainment, via the company's website.
 To promote the series launch, another short was an animated version of the duo's famous Twelve Days of Christmas from their 1981 album, The Great White North.
 Two trailers have also been released online to promote the series, the first premiered at the 2008 New York Comic-Con.
 The last known short was an internet greeting from the characters to promote Canada Day and Canwest's upcoming marathon via email. This short was introduced shortly after the first season ended its run on Global TV.

See also 

The Great White North
Strange Brew
Bob & Doug McKenzie's Two-Four Anniversary

References

External links

2009 Canadian television series debuts
2011 Canadian television series endings
2000s Canadian adult animated television series
2010s Canadian adult animated television series
2000s Canadian sitcoms
2010s Canadian sitcoms
2000s Canadian workplace comedy television series
2010s Canadian workplace comedy television series
Bob and Doug McKenzie
Canadian adult animated comedy television series
Canadian animated sitcoms
Canadian animated television spin-offs
Canadian flash animated television series
English-language television shows
Fictional duos
Global Television Network original programming
Television duos
Television shows set in Canada